John Ó hAirt  was an Irish Roman Catholic bishop in the mid-18th century. He was Roman Catholic Bishop of Achonry from 1735 to 1739.

References

1739 deaths

Year of birth unknown
18th-century Roman Catholic bishops in Ireland
Roman Catholic bishops of Achonry